Stefan Knabe (born: 27 December 1963) is a sailor from Hamburg, West-Germany. who represented his country at the 1988 Summer Olympics in Busan, South Korea as crew member in the Soling. With helmsman Jens-Peter Wrede and fellow crew members Matthias Adamczewski they took the 15th place.

References

Living people
1963 births
Sailors at the 1988 Summer Olympics – Soling
Olympic sailors of West Germany
German male sailors (sport)